Esakiopteryx is a genus of moths in the family Geometridae described by Inoue in 1958.

Species
 Esakiopteryx venusta Yazaki, 1986
 Esakiopteryx volitans (Butler, 1878)

References

Trichopterygini